Miroslav Lajčák  (born 20 March 1963) is a Slovak politician and diplomat, former Minister of Foreign Affairs of the Slovak Republic. In addition, Lajčak also served as President of the United Nations General Assembly for the 72nd session from 2017 until 2018.

A key figure in the mediation of the post-conflict crises in the Western Balkans, Lajčák also served as Executive Assistant to the UN Secretary-General’s Special Envoy for the Balkans from 1999 to 2001. He negotiated, organized and supervised the referendum on the independence of Montenegro in 2006 on behalf of the European Union.

From 2007 to 2009, Lajčák served as High Representative of the International Community and European Union Special Representative in Bosnia and Herzegovina. During his tenure, Bosnia and Herzegovina signed the landmark Stabilization and Association Agreement with the European Union.

Currently Lajčak is the EU Special Representative for the Belgrade-Pristina Dialogue and other Western Balkan regional issues, a position he assumed on 2 April 2020.

Biography

Education and private life 
Lajčák attended primary school in Stará Ľubovňa. In 1977 his family moved to Bratislava, where he enrolled in grammar school on Bilíková Street. He finished the final year of his secondary education at grammar school in Banská Štiavnica. Later he studied law at the Comenius University in Bratislava for a year before he obtained a master's degree in international relations from the Moscow State Institute of International Relations (MGIMO). As a student, he joined the Communist Party of Czechoslovakia. He also studied at the George C. Marshall European Center for Security Studies in Garmisch-Partenkirchen, Germany.

He has received several state honours, including the Order of the Yugoslav Star, 1st Class in 2005, the Order of Honour of the Republic of Moldova in 2014, the Order of the Montenegrin Great Star in 2016, the Royal Order of the Polar Star awarded by Swedish King Carl XVI Gustaf in 2020 and the Order Star of Romania in the rank Grand Officer also in 2020.

Lajčák has also received honorary doctorates by the following institutions: UNWE University of National and World Economy (Bulgaria), University of Mostar (Bosnia and Herzegovina), MGIMO Moscow State Institute of International Relations (Russia), National University of Political Studies and Public Administration (Romania) and University of Montenegro (Montenegro).

Apart from his native Slovak, Lajčák is fluent in English, German, Russian, French and the South Slavic languages, including Bulgarian.

He is married to Jarmila Lajčáková-Hargašová, a Slovak TV news presenter. He has two daughters.

Diplomatic career (1988–2005) 
A member of the Communist Party, Lajčák joined the Czechoslovak foreign ministry in 1988. Between 1991 and 1993 Lajčák was posted to the Czechoslovak and subsequently Slovak embassy in Moscow.

Upon his return to Slovakia in 1993 to the newly established Ministry of Foreign Affairs of Slovakia, he took an active part in forming the national Foreign Service. He became Director of the Cabinet of the Foreign Minister and later on Director of the Cabinet of the Prime Minister Jozef Moravčík.

In 1994, he was appointed Slovak Ambassador to Japan, becoming the youngest-ever Head of Diplomatic Mission of Slovakia. At the age of 31, he was also the youngest foreign ambassador in Japan. In 1998 after his posting to Japan he returned to the Foreign Ministry to become for the second time Director of Slovakia Foreign Minister’s Cabinet.

His international engagements started in 1999 when he served as the Executive Assistant to the United Nations Secretary–General ́s Special Envoy for the Balkans, Eduard Kukan (until 2001).

Between 2001 and 2005, Lajčák was based in Belgrade as Slovakia's Ambassador to the Federal Republic of Yugoslavia (later Serbia and Montenegro), with accreditation also on Albania and the Republic of Macedonia.

Following his term in Belgrade, he was named Political Director at the Foreign Ministry of Slovakia (2005-2007).

Supervisor of Montenegro's independence referendum (2005) 
In 2005 the EU diplomacy chief Javier Solana called Lajčák to supervise the 2006 Montenegrin independence referendum, which was approved with a 55.5% of favourable votes. Serbs and Montenegrins remember him as a tough though fair negotiator.

International High Representative for Bosnia and Herzegovina (2007–2009) 
On 30 June 2007. Solana again chose Lajčák to succeed to Christian Schwarz-Schilling as the double-hatted High Representative for Bosnia and Herzegovina/EU Special Representative for Bosnia and Herzegovina (OHR/EUSR). With a mandate from the UN Security Council, he liaised regularly with the United Nations and reported periodically to the Security Council. During his tenure, BiH signed the Stabilization and Association Agreement with the EU, the most remarkable integration success of the country for many years to come. He also launched activities to reach out to the population including speaking tours and a website for dialogue with citizens.

He was soon acclaimed as "person of the year" by both Banja Luka-based Nezavisne novine and Sarajevo-based Dnevni Avaz dailies.

Lajčák acted in 2007–09 in line with a moderately strong role of the OHR (using Bonn powers more than Schwarz-Schilling but less than Paddy Ashdown); critics of the international supervision of Bosnia and Herzegovina, including David Chandler, pointed to his "authoritarian stance" as responsible for creating a further crisis by trying to impose major institutional change and alter the Dayton peace agreement framework without domestic ownership or legitimacy.
Lajčák is deemed to have achieved results on the ground but at the price of endangering the credibility of EU conditionality by accepting merely cosmetic legal changes. He left BiH in January 2009 after being nominated to serve as Minister of Foreign Affairs of Slovakia.

Lajčák did resort to the use of the Bonn Powers in the crisis related to the 2007 Law on the Council of Ministers, which caused a showdown with Milorad Dodik’s SNSD. The law, aimed at revising decision-making procedures to make the BiH government less prone to blockages, triggered the resignation of the Bosnian prime minister Nikola Spiric (SNSD) and withdrawal of Bosnian Serbs from state institutions. The OHR then published an “authentic interpretation” of the law, claiming that it did not intend to change the composition of the Council of Ministers. Lajčák also removed RS police officials deemed complicit in war crimes. Upon instructions of Solana, Lajčák contented himself of cosmetic changes to bring to an end the police reform saga, leading to the signature of the Stabilisation and Association Agreement between Bosnia and Herzegovina and the EU in June 2008, despite claims that the EU had lost his credibility by lowering the bar which had been set by Paddy Ashdown in 2005.

Minister of Foreign Affairs of Slovakia (2009–2010, 2012–2020) 

From 26 January 2009 until July 2010, Lajčák served as Minister of Foreign Affairs in Robert Fico's First Cabinet.

From December 2010 to April 2012 Lajčák served as Managing Director for Europe and Central Asia in the EU's External Action Service.

In April 2012 Lajčák was appointed again, as an independent, to the post of foreign minister and deputy prime minister in Robert Fico's Second Cabinet. In addition, he became Chairman of the Government's Council for Human Rights, National Minorities and Gender Equality.

After the 2014 Bosnian general election, he encouraged Dodik's SNSD party to enter the government coalition, despite having lost the Presidency seat, claiming that "new authorities must have legitimacy."

At the height of the Crimea Crisis, in May 2014, he visited Moscow and met with the Russian foreign minister Lavrov and deputy prime minister Dmitry Rogozin. Rogozin and Lajčák were co-chairs of a joint Slovak-Russian cooperation body.

In November 2015 Slovakia voted against Kosovo's membership in UNESCO. Lajčák later explained that Slovakia wanted Belgrade and Pristina to interpret it as a message, that the international community expects parties to submit such proposals on the basis of mutual agreement and consent. "Our interest is to strengthen the dialogue. One of the reasons why we took a negative attitude is that the issue was not the subject of the dialogue and we are afraid it could worsen it," he added.

In 2016 Lajčák called on the EU to abandon its “ideological” approach to Russia.

In October 2018, he threatened to freeze relations with Vietnam over the case of a Vietnamese businessman who was kidnapped by Vietnamese agents and smuggled back home through Slovakia.

In November 2018, Lajčák lambasted as "anti-democratic" the proposed Kosovo–Serbia land swap and cautioned against the regional repercussions of such a proposal.

Since 2019, Lajčák has been serving on the Transatlantic Task Force of the German Marshall Fund and the Bundeskanzler-Helmut-Schmidt-Stiftung (BKHS), co-chaired by Karen Donfried and Wolfgang Ischinger.

Between the EU-facilitated 5 August political agreement and the December breakthrough on a new SNSD-led government, on 27 Oct 2019, Lajčák invited both Milorad Dodik and Dragan Covic to Bratislava for “international mediation” which paved the way for BiH adopting its ANP with NATO.

Lajčák announced in November 2019 that he would leave Slovak politics following the 2020 Slovak parliamentary election.

EEAS Managing Director for Europe and Central Asia (2010–2012) 

From 2010 to 2012, Lajčák helped shape the newly formed diplomatic service of the European Union, the European External Action Service, as its Managing Director for Europe and Central Asia. In addition, he also served as the EU's Chief Negotiator for the Ukraine–European Union Association Agreement and Moldova–European Union Association Agreement, as well as the EU Representative for the 5+2 Talks on the Transnistrian Settlement Process.

Slovak Republic Presidency of the Council of the EU (2016) 

In June 2016, Slovakia took over the Presidency of the EU Council. In his speech presenting the priorities for the Slovak Presidency Lajčák said "Today, we call the EU our home, the euro our currency and Schengen our area. The Presidency is the culmination of our integration journey. We are at the core of Europe. And we are grateful for that because we were given a lot. It´s time to give back."

In November 2016, following revelations by a whistleblower, Transparency International Slovakia accused Lajčák of dubious procurement contracts during the Slovak EU Council Presidency. The accusation was never proven.

Candidacy for United Nations Secretary-General 

From May 2016, Lajčák was one official candidate for the Eastern European Group to succeed to Ban Ki-moon during the 2016 United Nations Secretary-General selection; he ended up in the second place after the current UN Secretary-General, Antonio Guterres.

President of the United Nations General Assembly (2017–2018) 

Lajčák also served as President of the 72nd Session of the UN General Assembly from 2017 to 2018 where he advocated for dialogue, strengthening multilateralism and the need to serve all people. He was the first president to publish his financial disclosure summary.

OSCE Chairperson-in-Office (2019) 

In 2019, Lajčák was particularly active in East and South-East Europe as Chairperson-in-office of the OSCE. Slovakia's OSCE Chairmanship focused on people, dialogue and stability. During his tenure, Lajčák visited 15 OSCE field presences to highlight the OSCE's important work on the ground, and held high-level talks with interlocutors in the OSCE region, including Russian Foreign Minister Sergey Lavrov in February, June, and September 2019, as well as US Secretary of State Mike Pompeo in April 2019. Ahead of the 26th OSCE Ministerial Council, Lajčák shared his Bratislava Appeal, an informal initiative addressed to foreign ministers from across the OSCE area arguing for more support to the OSCE and multilateralism.

EU Special Representative for the Belgrade-Pristina Dialogue and other Western Balkan regional issues (2020) 
On 2 April 2020, Lajčák was appointed by the EU Council as EU Special Representative for the Belgrade-Pristina Dialogue and other Western Balkan regional issues. His 12-months mandate includes the tasks to achieve comprehensive normalization of the relations between Serbia and Kosovo, improve good neighborly relations and reconciliation between partners in the Western Balkans, helping them overcome the legacy of the past, and contribute to the consistency and effectiveness of EU action in the Western Balkans. From 1 April 2021, his mandate was extended until 31 August 2022.

Other activities
 European Council on Foreign Relations (ECFR), Member
 Friends of Europe, Member of the Board of Trustees

See also
List of foreign ministers in 2017

References

External links
 
 Official curriculum vitae of Lajčák (as of 2012)

|-

|-

1963 births
Living people
Foreign Ministers of Slovakia
Presidents of the United Nations General Assembly
Ambassadors of Slovakia to Albania
Ambassadors of Slovakia to Japan
Ambassadors of Slovakia to Serbia and Montenegro
Ambassadors of Slovakia to North Macedonia
Comenius University alumni
European Union diplomats
High Representatives for Bosnia and Herzegovina
Moscow State Institute of International Relations alumni
People from Poprad
Slovak diplomats
Slovak officials of the European Union